The  was an influential medieval Buddhist text composed in 985 by the Japanese Buddhist monk Genshin.  Three volumes in length and in kanbun prose, the text is a comprehensive analysis of Buddhist practices related to rebirth in the Pure Land of Amida Buddha, drawing upon earlier Buddhist texts from China, and sutras such as the Contemplation Sutra.  Genshin advocated a collection of mutually supportive practices, such as sutra recitation,  centered around visual meditation of Amitabha Buddha where later Pure Land sects favored an approach that relied on exclusive recitation of the verbal nembutsu. The text is also well known for its graphic descriptions of the Hell realms, and sufferings one might endure for harmful acts committed in this life. Its influence can be seen in Japanese Buddhist paintings and other, later, texts. The founder of Jōdo Shinshū Buddhism, Shinran, wrote an influential commentary on the Ōjōyōshū titled, "Notes on Essentials of Rebirth", while Hōnen first encountered Pure Land teachings after studying Genshin's writings.

In 986, a copy was sent to China at Genshin's request and was reportedly deposited at Guoqingsi Temple on Mount Tiantai some time before 990.

Contents 

The contents of the Ōjōyōshū are divided into ten chapters (chapter names translated by professors Robert Rhodes and Richard Payne):
 Loathing the Defiled Realm – a lengthy exploration of traditional states of existence in the cycle of rebirth and why these were undesirable.
 Seeking the Pure Land – why the Pure Land of Amitabha differs from these undesirable states of rebirth.
 Proofs for the Land of Supreme Bliss
 Proper Practice of the Nembutsu – a careful and detailed analysis of various nembutsu practices that range from complex visualization practices to simple recitation of the namu amida butsu.  Here, Genshin reasserts the traditional Tendai Buddhist view of nembutsu meaning mindfulness (e.g. contemplation) of the Buddha.  This chapter also explores why the nembutsu was effective, including an exploration of Amitabha Buddha's power to rescue sentient beings, etc.
 Aids to the Nembutsu – this chapter explores other auxiliary practices to make one's nembutsu practice more effective.  Here, Genshin writes It is impossible to catch a fowl using a net consisting of one mesh. (Likewise, it is only by) employing myriad techniques to aid the contemplative mindfulness that the great matter of birth (in the Pure Land) is accomplished.
 Nembutsu for Special Occasions – this chapter covered extraordinary forms of nembutsu practices for special occasions or retreats.
 Benefits of the Nembutsu – this chapters explores benefits of practicing the nembutsu'' including nullifying evil karma, obtaining protection from the Buddhas and bodhisattvas and so on.
 Proofs for the Nembutsu
 Various Practices for Birth [in the Pure Land]
 Discussion of Doctrinal Problems

Thus, the Ōjōyōshū was intended as a comprehensive guide toward rebirth in the Pure Land of Amitabha Buddha in what Genshin believed was the declining age of the Dharma where the efficacy of the traditional Buddhist path toward buddhahood was no longer feasible.  By gaining birth in the Pure Land, one could thus more readily undertake practices there.

See also
 Ōjō

References

Further reading
 Horton, Sarah (2004). The Influence of the Ōjōyōshū in Late Tenth- and Early Eleventh-Century Japan, Japanese Journal of Religious Studies 31 (1), 29–54
 
 
  Rhodes, Robert F. (2007). Ōjōyōshū, Nihon Ōjō Gokuraku-ki, and the Construction of Pure Land Discourse in Heian Japan Japanese Journal of Religious Studies 34 (2), 249–270

External links 
 "The Influence of Genshin's Ojoyoshu on Honen"

Late Old Japanese texts
Books about Buddhism in the Heian period